William Cooper (1868 - 29 November 1957) was a member of the Queensland Legislative Assembly.

Biography
Cooper was born at Maitland, New South Wales, the son of Henry John Cooper and his wife Elizabeth (née Chaffe). He was educated in Maitland and was a blacksmith in Western Australia and a railway worker on the Rosewood-Grandchester line.

On 1 January 1902, he married Ida Emma Ernst (died 1955) and together had four sons and two daughters. Cooper died at Ipswich in November 1957.

Public life
Cooper, the Labor Party candidate, won the seat of Rosewood at the 1918 state election, defeating the sitting member, Henry Stevens. Cooper held the seat until 1929, when he was defeated by Ted Maher.

References

Members of the Queensland Legislative Assembly
1868 births
1957 deaths
Australian Labor Party members of the Parliament of Queensland